Boy Recto is a 1992 Philippine action film directed by Jett C. Espiritu. The film stars Ronnie Ricketts as the title role.

The film is streaming online on YouTube.

Cast
 Ronnie Ricketts as Restituto / Boy Recto
 Aiko Melendez as Ester Legarda
 Jess Lapid Jr. as Lupo Garcia
 Bembol Roco as Rip
 Michael de Mesa as Alexander Aguila
 Atoy Co as Damian Mendiola
 Kimberly Diaz as Raquel Monte
 Marita Zobel as Aling Chayong
 Zandro Zamora as Kabo de Leon
 Fred Moro as Fredo
 Philip Gamboa as Police Sgt.
 Ramil Rodriguez as Fiscal Aguila
 Renato del Prado as Estong
 Gilda Aragon as Corazon
 Jeena Alvarez as Kristina
 Rowell Mariano as Noynoy
 Mely Tagasa as Ms. Ampalaya
 Ben Dato as Gardo
 Ross Rival as Cesar
 Rey Sagum as Esteban
 Conrad Poe as Kutsero
 Ramon Reyes as Warden
 Nanding Fernandez as Restituto's Father
 Roland Montes as Killer of Restituto's Father

References

External links

Full Movie on Solar Pictures

1992 films
1992 action films
Filipino-language films
Philippine action films
Moviestars Production films
Films directed by Jett C. Espiritu